Nowy Sacz Voivodeship was a unit of administrative division and local government, located in southern Poland in the years 1975–1998, superseded by Lesser Poland Voivodeship. Its capital city was Nowy Sącz.

Major cities and towns (population in 1995)
 Nowy Sącz (82,100)
 Nowy Targ (34,000)
 Gorlice (30,200)
 Zakopane (30,000)
 Limanowa (15,000)
 Rabka
 Szczawnica
 Jordanów

See also
 Voivodeships of Poland

Former voivodeships of Poland (1975–1998)
History of Lesser Poland Voivodeship